Irfan Sabir  (born December 19, 1977) is a Canadian lawyer and politician who was elected to the Legislative Assembly of Alberta in the 2015 and 2019 Alberta general elections to represent the electoral district of Calgary-Bhullar-McCall. He is a member of the Alberta New Democratic Party. In the 29th Alberta Legislature his party formed a majority government and he was a member of the Executive Council of Alberta as the Minister of Community and Social Services between 2015 and 2019. In the 30th Alberta Legislature, beginning in 2019, his party formed the official opposition to a United Conservative Party majority government.

Background 
Sabir was raised in Rawalakot, Azad Kashmir, Pakistan, where he obtained an economics degree. He moved to Calgary in 2004, and obtained degrees in social work and law at the University of Calgary. In 2012, he began working at Maurice Law Barristers and Solicitors, where he specialized in Aboriginal law. In the past, he has also worked for a Calgary homeless shelter and volunteered for Calgary Legal Guidance and Red Cross Canada.

Electoral history

2015 general election

2019 general election

References

1970s births
Alberta New Democratic Party MLAs
Lawyers in Alberta
Living people
Canadian people of Azad Kashmiri descent
Members of the Executive Council of Alberta
Politicians from Calgary
Pakistani emigrants to Canada
Naturalized citizens of Canada
Canadian politicians of Pakistani descent
People from Rawalakot
21st-century Canadian politicians